John Grogan (30 October 1915 – 1976) was a Scottish professional footballer who played in the Football League for Leicester City and Mansfield Town.

References

20th-century births
1976 deaths
Scottish footballers
Association football defenders
English Football League players
Shawfield F.C. players
Mansfield Town F.C. players
Leicester City F.C. players